Ricardo Rusticucci (16 May 1946 – 8 November 2014) was an Argentine sport shooter who competed in the 1972 Summer Olympics, in the 1976 Summer Olympics, in the 1984 Summer Olympics, in the 1992 Summer Olympics, and in the 1996 Summer Olympics.

References

1946 births
2014 deaths
Argentine male sport shooters
ISSF rifle shooters
Olympic shooters of Argentina
Shooters at the 1972 Summer Olympics
Shooters at the 1976 Summer Olympics
Shooters at the 1984 Summer Olympics
Shooters at the 1992 Summer Olympics
Shooters at the 1996 Summer Olympics
Pan American Games medalists in shooting
Pan American Games gold medalists for Argentina
Pan American Games bronze medalists for Argentina
Shooters at the 1983 Pan American Games
Medalists at the 1983 Pan American Games
Sportspeople from Mendoza Province